The 2009–10 Wake Forest Demon Deacons men's basketball team represented Wake Forest University. The team's head coach was Dino Gaudio. The team played its home games at Lawrence Joel Veterans Memorial Coliseum in Winston-Salem, North Carolina, and is a member of the Atlantic Coast Conference. They finished the season 20–11, 9–7 in ACC play and lost in the first round of the 2010 ACC men's basketball tournament. They received an at–large bid to the 2010 NCAA Division I men's basketball tournament, earning a 9 seed in the East Region. They defeated 8 seed Texas in overtime in the first round before losing to 1 seed and AP #2 Kentucky in the second round.

Roster

Schedule

|-
!colspan=9| Regular season

|-
!colspan=9| ACC tournament

|-
!colspan=9| NCAA tournament

|-

Leading scorer by game

Rankings

References

Wake Forest
Wake Forest Demon Deacons men's basketball seasons
Wake Forest